A slip knot is a releasable stopper knot.

Slipknot may also refer to:

Music
 Slipknot (band), an American heavy metal band
 Slipknot (album)
 "Slipknot", a song on their demo Mate. Feed. Kill. Repeat.
 "Slipknot!", a song by the Grateful Dead from Blues for Allah
 "Slip Knot (Hang Knot)", a 1944 song by Woody Guthrie
 "Slipknot", a song by XXXTentacion from Revenge and Members Only, Vol 3

Other uses
 Slipknot (comics), a fictional supervillain
 SlipKnot (web browser), an early web browser

See also
Slipped knot, a knot finished with a bight rather than a free end